Xie Qing (born February 11, 1988) is a Chinese swimmer. At the 2016 Summer Paralympics she won a gold medal at the Women's 100 metre freestyle S11 event with 1:08.03, a bronze medal at the Women's 400 metre freestyle S11 event with 5:25.14 and another bronze medal at the Women's 200 metre individual medley SM11 event with 2:51.98.

References

Living people
Swimmers at the 2016 Summer Paralympics
Medalists at the 2016 Summer Paralympics
Paralympic gold medalists for China
Paralympic bronze medalists for China
Paralympic swimmers of China
Chinese female medley swimmers
S11-classified Paralympic swimmers
Chinese female freestyle swimmers
1988 births
Paralympic medalists in swimming
21st-century Chinese women